Balsam Township may refer to:

Balsam Township, Aitkin County, Minnesota
Balsam Township, Itasca County, Minnesota

Minnesota township disambiguation pages